The French angelfish (Pomacanthus paru) is a species of marine ray-finned fish, a marine angelfish belonging to the family Pomacanthidae. It occurs in the Western Atlantic Ocean.

Description

The French angelfish has a laterally compressed body which is almost circular in shape. The head is deep with a short snout ending in a small mouth which contains numerous bristle-like teeth. There is an obvious spine at the corner of the preoperculum while there are no spines on the operculum or under the eye. The dorsal fin contains 10 spines and 29-31 soft rays while the anal fin contains 3 spines and 22-24 soft rays. The juveniles are almost completely  black apart from five vertical yellow bands the first around  the mouth and the last at the caudal peduncle, the bands on the body are curved. The caudal fin has yellow margins. The adults are also mainly black but most of the scales on the body have a golden-yellow edge. They have a white mouth and a yellow orbit. The pectoral fins have a wide orange-yellow band and the dorsal fin has a long yellow filamentous extension growing from its soft-rayed part.

Distribution
The French angelfish is found in the western Atlantic from New York and the Bahamas to Brazil, and also the Gulf of Mexico and the Caribbean, including the Antilles, Roatan, and the eastern Atlantic from around Ascension Island and St. Paul's Rocks.

Habitat and biology
It is common on rocky and coral reefs where it is normally encountered in pairs, frequently in the vicinity of sea fans. Its diet comprises sponges, algae, bryozoans, zoantharians, gorgonians, hydroids, coral and tunicates. These pairs are highly territorial, and typically both vigorously defending their territory from their neighbours. Juveniles act as cleaner fish, establishing cleaning stations where they remove ectoparasites and clean a wide range of other fish species. Species recorded as being clients of juvenile French angelfish, include jacks, snappers, morays, grunts, surgeonfishes and wrasses.. When they are trying to draw client fish to the cleaning station the juvenile displays by using a fluttering swimming motion and as it cleans it touches the recipient of its service with its pelvic fins. These fish are active during the daylight hours, but seek shelter in their designated hiding spot where they return every night. They can produce a knocking sound when alarmed.

The pair normally swim a short distance above the reef. There are no obvious courtship displays or clear sexual dimorphism. As they ascend, both angle their bodies slightly, with their vents very close together, even touching. They hold this posture throughout the zenith of their curve separating as they descend. Neighbouring pairs were observed undertaking  similar movements above the reef at roughly the same time. The observers were unable to ascertain if gametes were released in these displays. Neighbouring pairs were not seen interfering with these displays. This species is a protogynous hermaphrodite, the female can change sex to become a male if no male is present.

Systematics
The French angelfish was first formally described as Chaetodon paru by the German physician and naturalist Marcus Elieser Bloch (1723–1799) with the type locality given as Brazil and Jamaica. The species is placed by some authorities in the subgenus Pomacanthus,. The specific name of this species, paru is the Portuguese name for this species.

Utilisation
The French angelfish is common in the aquarium trade, collection and export to the United States and European markets being common in Brazil. it has been bred in captivity. It is harvested for food, its flesh being considered highly palatable, although it has been reported to be a source of ciguatera poisoning in humans.

References

External links

 Video of a Juvenile French Angelfish (Pomacanthus paru)—Jim W. Arch 19:15, 20 May 2014 (UTC)
 Salty Endeavors discussed the French Angelfish juvenile compared to a Grey Angelfish juvenile-Henry S.
 

French angelfish
Fish of the Western Atlantic
French angelfish